Chemancheri Kunhiraman Nair, also known as Guru Chemancheri (26 June 1916 – 15 March 2021) was an Indian Kathakali actor. He spent over eighty years learning and teaching and performing Kathakali, a major form of classical Indian dance. The Government of India awarded him the fourth highest civilian honour, Padma Shri in 2017.

Personal life  
Kunhiraman Nair was raised in the village of Cheliya, near Koyilandy, Kozhikode district.  His mother died when he was only three years old, and then, at the age of thirteen, he lost his father. He had an early interest in the performances presented by visiting drama troupes, and at the age of fifteen, left his home to begin training at a Kathikali centre, some 25 km away.

Later, he came to live in Kannur, and at the age of 31, he met his life partner, Janaki. After six years of marriage, the couple lost their first-born child, a girl. Janaki died a year later, leaving Nair to raise their one-year-old son.

Education 
Nair received Kathakali training under Gurus (teachers/mentors) Karunakara Menon, Ambu Panicker, Katathanad Ramunni Nair and Matasseri Kochugovindan Nair. He studied Bharatanatyam under Kalamandalam Madhavan Nair, Salem Rajaratnam Pillai and Balachandra Bhai of Madras. Within the art of Kathakali, he was attracted to the Kallatikkotan of the Kaplingatan sampradayam and came to specialise in it.

Career and teaching 
After many years as a performer, Nair eventually became a teacher of Kathakali. Nonetheless, he continued as a stage performer for selected roles including the Srikrishna Vesham in Santhanagopalam and several dance-dramas seen in India. He also choreographed various dance-dramas. He said that the role of Krishna is his favorite.

He established an institution named Bharateeya Natya Kalalayam at Kannur in 1945. Beginning in 1947, he served as Principal of the Bharatheeya Natya Kalalayam at Tellicherry.

Later, he established another school, Cheliya Kathakali Vidyalayam, in 1983, in Cheliya.

In addition to Kathakali, he also supported other dance-drama forms, including Ashtapadi Attam, based on the verses of Gitagovindam, by the medieval poet Jayadeva. Nair, in collaboration with another dance master, Guru Gopinath, formulated Kerala Natanam, which is based on Kathakali and Mohiniyattam, and became a government-recognised dance form in Kerala.

During the celebrations for his 100th birthday, actor and dancer Vineeth, performed a classical dance as a tribute to Nair, in the name of ‘Krishnaparvam’.

Death 
Nair died on 15 March 2021 at his residence at Cheliya village near Koyilandy at the age of 104.

Awards and honours 
 1979 Kerala Sangeetha Nataka Akademi Award recognised him for his contributions.
 1999 Kerala Sangeetha Nataka Akademi Fellowship of the Academy
 2001 Kerala Kalamandalam granted an award for special contributions to art.
 2002 Darpanam Natyakulapathi award 
 2002 Kerala Kalamandalam Visishta Kala Seva Award
 2009 Kalaratnam Award of Kerala Kalamandalam
 2017 Padma Shri awarded by the Government of India
 Mayilpeeli award 
 Sangeet Natak Akademi Tagore Award for contributions to Kathakali

References

1916 births
2021 deaths
Indian centenarians
Indian male dancers
Indian dance teachers
Performers of Indian classical dance
Kathakali exponents
Artists from Kozhikode
Dancers from Kerala
Teachers of Indian classical dance
20th-century Indian dancers
20th-century Indian educators
Educators from Kerala
Recipients of the Padma Shri
Men centenarians
Recipients of the Kerala Sangeetha Nataka Akademi Fellowship
Recipients of the Kerala Sangeetha Nataka Akademi Award